Foot School TV (formerly TFOU TV) was a French television channel. It was originally launched as TFOU TV by TF1 on 23 April 2003, and was available on multichannel television platforms like TPS, Orange TV, Club Internet and Freebox TV. On 29 February 2008, the channel was relaunched as Foot School TV, before it was shutdown in 2013.

The TFOU name continues to be used by a programming block on TF1, which was launched on 1 January 2007.

Television networks in France
TF1 original programming
2003 in French television